Matsukura Castle might refer to:

Matsukura Castle (Toyama Prefecture), a Muromachi Period castle located in Etchū Province (present day Uozu, Toyama Prefecture, Japan)
Matsukura Castle (Gifu Prefecture), a Sengoku Period castle located in Hida Province (present day Takayama, Gifu Prefecture, Japan)